Beffcote is a village in Staffordshire, England. For the population taken at the United Kingdom Census 2011 see Gnosall.

Villages in Staffordshire